Pushpesh Pant (born 1946) is an Indian academic, food critic and historian. He retired as a Professor of International relations from Jawaharlal Nehru University, Delhi. He is one of India's leading experts on International Relations as well as Indian cuisine, and as a columnist has written for a number of major publications like Forbes, Open, Outlook, Times of India and The Tribune.

His book, India: The Cookbook (2011), was named by The New York Times as one of the best cookbooks of the year.

Prof. Pant was also featured in Raja, Rasoi Aur Anya Kahaniyaan, an Indian television series on Indian cuisine available on The EPIC Channel. The series gives an inside look into the royal kitchens of India and also explores the history behind the cuisine of the Indian royals, showing how dishes were discovered, and their significance in Indian history.

He was also featured in an interview in The Australian.

The Government of India awarded him the Padma Shri in 2016.

Books
Professor Pant has published on travel and tourism, with over a dozen books to his name.
India: The Cookbook, 
Gourmet Journeys in India
Classic Cooking Of Punjab, with Jiggs Kalra. Allied Publishers, 2004, .
International Relations in 21st Century

References

External links
Pushpesh Pant at Jawaharlal Nehru University

20th-century Indian historians
1947 births
Living people
Academic staff of Jawaharlal Nehru University
Indian columnists
Indian food writers
Indian political writers
Food historians
Writers from Uttarakhand
International relations scholars
Recipients of the Padma Shri in literature & education
Uttarakhand academics
Indian foreign policy writers
International relations historians
Scholars of Indian foreign policy